The Ageless Story is a 1939 picture book by Lauren Ford. The book is about Mary and the birth and childhood of Jesus. The book was a recipient of a 1940 Caldecott Honor for its illustrations.

References 

1939 children's books
American picture books
Caldecott Honor-winning works